Mount Swanzy is a  mountain summit located in Glacier National Park in the Selkirk Mountains of British Columbia, Canada. Mount Swanzy is surrounded by ice including the Bonney Glacier, Clarke Glacier, and Swanzy Glacier. Its nearest higher peak is Mount Bonney,  to the west.

History
The mountain was named in 1895 by Messrs. Abbot, Fay, and Thompson, for the Reverend Henry Swanzy, who with the Reverend William Spotswood Green introduced the world to the Selkirk Mountains following their 1888 first ascents of Mount Bonney and others.

The first ascent of the mountain was made in 1900 by Arthur Michael, Sydney Spencer, Edouard Feuz Sr, and Friedrich Michel.

The mountain's name was officially adopted in 1932 when approved by the Geographical Names Board of Canada.

Climate

Based on the Köppen climate classification, Mount Swanzy is located in a subarctic climate zone with cold, snowy winters, and mild summers.

See also

Geography of British Columbia

References

External links
 Weather: Mount Swanzy

Two-thousanders of British Columbia
Selkirk Mountains
Glacier National Park (Canada)
Columbia Country
Kootenay Land District